William Boughton is an English conductor.

Overview 
Boughton has guest conducted with many of the world's leading orchestras from San Francisco to Helsinki. As founder, artistic and music director with the English Symphony Orchestra (ESO), Boughton developed the orchestra's repertoire through the Viennese classics to contemporary music. Together, he and the ESO built an impressive discography of internationally acclaimed recordings with Nimbus Records, a number of which have reached the top ten in the US charts. He has also recorded with the Philharmonia, Royal Philharmonic and London Symphony Orchestras.

Boughton previously served as the music director for the New Haven Symphony Orchestra.

References

External links
 William Boughton home page

English conductors (music)
British male conductors (music)
Year of birth missing (living people)
Living people
21st-century British conductors (music)
21st-century British male musicians